Hain Rebas (born 23 January 1943 in Tallinn) is an Estonian historian and politician.

From 1992 to 1993, he was Minister of Defence.

References

Living people
1943 births
20th-century Estonian historians
Defence Ministers of Estonia